Vidya Academy of Science and Technology (VAST) is a privately financed engineering college in Thrissur District in Kerala. The college offers a degree in Bachelor of Technology and courses in six branches of engineering - Production, Civil, Computer Science, Electrical and Electronics, Electronics and Communication, Mechanical. The college also offers a degree in Masters in Computer Application (MCA). From the year 2011, the college has offered four MTech courses and two PhD programmes in Electrical engineering & Computer science engineering.
The college was established and is administered by Vidya International Charitable Trust (VICT), a body formed by more than a thousand non-resident Keralites mostly based in the Arab States of the Persian Gulf.

History

The college started functioning in August 2003 offering BTech courses in four branches of engineering, Computer Science, Electrical and Electronics, Electronics and Communication, and Mechanical Engineering.

From 2006, the college began to offer BTech programmes in Civil Engineering and Production Engineering. In the same year, the postgraduate programme of Masters in Computer Application was started. There are around 1900 students and 112 faculty members. From 2012, the college has offered MTech in Power electronics and Drives, Computer science and engineering, Structural engineering and Embedded systems. The college is one of the Research Center for Doctoral Research (PhD) of Anna University, Chennai.

Certifications
The college is affiliated to the APJ Abdul Kalam Technological University (KTU) (formerly under University of Calicut), approved by the All India Council for Technical Education and recognized by the Government of Kerala (see External links below). It has also secured ISO 9001:2008 certification. It is also a research center for Doctoral Research for Department of EEE and Dept. of CSE from Anna University, Chennai.
College has National Board of Accreditation (NBA) for its EEE, ME and CE undergraduate programmes.

Departments and courses
The college has seven engineering departments (including the Department of Computer Applications) and three allied departments. The College runs six BTech, four MTech & two PhD programmes in engineering and a MCA programme.

Engineering departments
 Department of Electrical and Electronics Engineering (60 + 30 PG + 8 PhD)
 Department of Civil Engineering (120 + 24 PG)
 Department of Computer Science and Engineering (120 + 30 PG + 8 PhD)
 Department of Computer Applications (60 PG)
 Department of Electronics and Communication Engineering (120 + 24 PG)
 Department of Mechanical Engineering (120)

Allied departments
 Department of Applied Sciences
 Department of Humanities
 Department of Production Engineering
 Department of Training and Placement

Academic support and services

Twinning Programme 
VIDYA has signed a memorandum of understanding (MoU) with State University of New York at New Paltz
 providing for a twinning programme arrangement.

Research and allied activities
The college has a forum in the form of Research Development Extension and Consultancy Cell (RDEC Cell) for promoting research and allied activities. The infrastructure facilities of the college are utilized for formulating and implementing research projects.  The laboratories provide the testing facilities.

Institutional memberships
The College has institutional memberships in the following professional associations :
 Computer Society of India (CSI)
 Indian Society for Technical Education (ISTE)
 Institution of Engineers (India)
 Nano Science and Technology Consortium
In addition, there are active student chapters of Computer Society of India, ISTE and Institution of Engineers (India), and also of Institute of Electrical and Electronics Engineers (IEEE) in the college.

Academic tie-ups
The college has academic tie-ups with these IT industries.
  Infosys Technologies Limited through their Campus-Connect programme
 Tata Consultancy Services Limited
 Cisco Systems through the Cisco Networking Academy at Amrita Vishwa Vidyapeetham, Coimbatore

National Service Scheme
There are two units, Unit 101 and Unit 200 of the National Service Scheme (NSS) in the college.

FOSS Club 
The college has an active Free & Open Source Software club called "FOSSers VAST" since 2008.

Admissions

For both BTech and MCA programmes, fifty percent of the students are selected by the Government of Kerala from the rank list prepared based on the Common Entrance Examination conducted by the commissioner of entrance examinations, and fifty percent of the students are selected by the management from a list prepared by them.

Scholarships

As part of its philanthropic activity, the Vidya International Charitable Trust, in co-operation with His Highness, Nahayan Bin Mubarak Al Nahyan, Minister of Higher Education and Scientific Research, United Arab Emirates, and Mr. Sunny Varkey, founder of GEMS Education, a consortium of educational institutions in India, the Middle East and Europe, awards nearly 100 scholarships.

Administration
Vidya International Charitable Trust, a non-profit charitable trust formed by a group of non-resident Indians and registered at Thiruvananthapuram in December 2000, is the promoter of the college. Under the provisions of the trust deed of Vidya International Charitable Trust, the board of trustees is the custodian of the trust and all its properties. The board of trustees vests the management and control of Vidya Academy of Science and Technology and other ventures of the trust on an executive committee of eleven trustees elected from the board of trustees. An advisory board guides the development of the college. A steering committee directs the day-to-day functioning of the college. There is also an academic council to provide leadership to the academic activities in the college. The chief patron is P. K. Asokan.

Notable alumni 
 Malavika Mohan - actress
 Dev Mohan - actor

See also
 Vidya Academy of Science and Technology, Technical campus, Kilimanoor, Thiruvananthapuram

References

External links

 Vidya Academy of Science and Technology, Official Website
 Vidya International Charitable Trust, Official Website
 Vidya Academy of Science and Technology in Wikimapia

Engineering colleges in Thrissur district
All India Council for Technical Education
Colleges affiliated with the University of Calicut
Private engineering colleges in Kerala
Engineering colleges in Kerala
Educational institutions established in 2003
Vidya Academy of Science and Technology
2003 establishments in Kerala